Saluri Hanumantha Rao (1917–1980) (Telugu: సాలూరు హనుమంతరావు) was a music composer of South Indian films. He is son of Saluri Sanyasi Raju who was a mridangam player for the concerts of Dwaram Venkataswami Naidu and also a lyricist.

Rao was born in 1917 at Sivaramapuram, near Salur (Vijayanagaram district). He was the elder brother of S. Rajeswara Rao. He started his early life as a student of Dwaram Venkataswami Naidu. He was trained in Carnatic and Hindusthani classical music. He became music composer for Golla Baama in the year 1944. He composed music for around 75 movies.

Rao married Raja Mani with whom he had three daughters and one son. Rao died 27 May 1980.

Films
 Radhika (1947)
 Golla Baama (1947)
 Rajee Naa Pranam (1954) (Telugu)
 Rajee En Kanmani (1954) (Tamil)
 Charana Daasi (1956) (background music)
 Allauddin Adhbhuta Deepam (1957)
 Veera Bhaskarudu (1959)
 Usha Parinayam (1961)
 Dakshayagnam (1962)
 Chandrahasa (1965) (Telugu, Kannada)
 Bandhavyalu (1968)
 Raithu Bidda (1971)
 Muhammad bin Tughluq (1972)
 Panjaramlo Pasi Paapa (1973)
 Aadadani Adrushtam (1974)
 Moguda? Pellama? (1975)
 Aradhana (1976)
 Poornamma Katha
 Swami Dhrohulu (1976)
 Manushullo Devudu
 Pratheegna (Kannada)
 Sathi Anasuya (Kannada)

External links
 Hanumantha Rao page at IMDB.

Telugu people
1917 births
1980 deaths
Indian male composers
20th-century Indian composers
Telugu film score composers
Tamil film score composers
Film musicians from Andhra Pradesh
Male film score composers
20th-century male musicians